Song of Seven is the second solo album by Yes lead singer Jon Anderson, released in 1980, and his first to use an actual band (the New Life Band).

Overview
Song of Seven was released during Anderson's first hiatus from Yes and supported by his first solo tour. 
Anderson has said the album's backing tracks took three weeks to record, with further overdubs another two or three weeks.

"Some Are Born", "Days", "Everybody Loves You" and "Hear It" were originally written and demoed during the Tormato sessions. The "Some Are Born" and "Days" demo versions from these sessions were included as bonus tracks on the 2004 CD reissue of Tormato, however, the arrangements recorded on Song of Seven draw more on Celtic and R&B influences.

Track listing
All songs written by Jon Anderson unless indicated.

Side One
"For You for Me" – 4:21
"Some Are Born" – 4:03
"Don't Forget (Nostalgia)" – 2:59
"Heart of the Matter" (Anderson, Ronnie Leahy) – 4:18
"Hear It" – 1:48

Side Two
"Everybody Loves You" – 4:06
"Take Your Time" – 3:07
"Days" – 3:28
"Song of Seven" – 11:16

Personnel
Jon Anderson - lead vocals, acoustic guitar (2), keyboards (1,7,8), harp (9)
Ronnie Leahy - keyboards (1-9)
 Damian Anderson - keyboards (5)
Ian Bairnson - guitar (1-3, 5-8), bass (2), backing vocals (2)
Clem Clempson - guitar (4,9)
John Giblin - fretless bass (1,3,6-9)
Jack Bruce - bass (4)
Mel - bass (5)
Morris Pert - drums, percussion (1-3, 5-7, 9)
Simon Phillips - drums (4)
Dick Morrissey - saxophone (2,4)
Johnny Dankworth - alto saxophone (3)
Chris Rainbow - backing vocals (2-4, 6,8,9)
Deborah Anderson - harmony vocals (9)
Delmé String Quartet; arranged by David Ogden (9)
Technical
Mike Dunne - engineer
Brian Gaylor - electronic
Jon Anderson - cover
Alwyn Clayden - art direction, design
Ian Nicholson - illustrations

Charts

Notes

References

1980 albums
Jon Anderson albums
Atlantic Records albums